The 1958 United States Senate election in Pennsylvania was held on November 4, 1958. Incumbent Republican U.S. Senator Edward Martin did not seek re-election. The Republican nominee, Hugh Scott, defeated Democratic nominee George M. Leader for the vacant seat.

As of 2021, this is the last Senate election where Fulton County voted Democratic.

General election

Candidates
George M. Leader, Governor of Pennsylvania (Democratic)
Hugh Scott, U.S. Representative from Northwest Philadelphia (Republican)

Results

|-
|-bgcolor="#EEEEEE"
| colspan="3" align="right" | Totals
| align="right" | 3,988,622
| align="right" | 100.00%
| align="right" | 

|}

See also 
 1958 United States Senate elections

References

Pennsylvania
1958
United States Senate